The Polish Soviet Socialist Republic, abbreviated to Polish SSR, was a proposition by the Provisional Polish Revolutionary Committee to establish a constituent republic of the Soviet Union for the Polish population, that emerged during the Polish–Soviet War in 1920. The idea assumed the formation of the Soviet republic from the territory of the Second Polish Republic, following Soviet victory in the war, however it was never executed, as Poland won the war in 1921.

History 
The idea was proposed in 1920 by the Provisional Polish Revolutionary Committee during the Polish–Soviet War. It assumed the creation of a constituent republic of the Soviet Union for the Polish population from the conquered territories of the Second Polish Republic, following Soviet victory in the war.

The Provisional Polish Revolutionary Committee was formed by the Communist Party of the Soviet Union, as a provisional government from territories of Poland conquered during the war. It announced its governance over the state on 30 July 1920, in Białystok, the first major city west of the Curzon Line. The committee announced its plan to create a Polish SSR in its Manifesto to the Polish working class of towns and villages (Polish: Manifest do polskiego ludu roboczego miast i wsi) by Felix Dzerzhinsky, which was announced in Vilnius on 30 July 1920. It stated, that the committee planned to create the Soviet republic following the gaining of Bolshevik control of the entirety of Poland.

See also 
 East Polish Soviet Socialist Republic
 Galician Soviet Socialist Republic
 Socialist Soviet Republic of Lithuania and Belorussia
 Polish People's Republic
Polish National District

Citations

Notes

References 

Proposed countries
Communism in Poland
Polish–Soviet War
Poland–Soviet Union relations
1920 in Poland
Russian irredentism